The 2023 NCAA Division III Men's Ice Hockey Tournament is the culmination of the 2022–23 season, the 38th such tournament in NCAA history.

Qualifying teams
Twelve teams qualified for the tournament in the following ways: (Pool A) eight teams received bids as a result of being conference tournament champions from conferences that possessed an automatic bid, (Pool C) four additional teams received at-large bids based upon their records.

Format
The tournament featured four rounds of play. All rounds were single-game elimination.

The top four rated teams received byes into the quarterfinal round and were arranged so that if they were to advance to the semifinals, the first seed would play the fourth seed and the second seed would play the third seed. Because there were three western teams and only one received a bye into the quarterfinals, all three were placed into the same bracket. Of the nine eastern teams, the six that did not receive byes were arranged so that the fourth eastern seed played the ninth eastern seed with the winner advancing to play the third eastern seed; the fifth eastern seed played the eighth eastern seed with the winner advancing to play the second eastern seed; and the sixth eastern seed played the seventh eastern seed with the winner advancing to play the first eastern seed. The higher-seeded team played host in all first round and quarterfinal matches.

Bracket

Note: * denotes overtime period(s)

All-Tournament Team

Record by conference

References

External links
2023 Division III Bracket

 
NCAA Division III ice hockey